Filaroididae is a family of nematodes belonging to the order Strongylida.

Genera:
 Filariopsis Van Thiel, 1926
 Filaroides van Beneden, 1858
 Oslerus Hall, 1921
 Parafilaroides Dougherty, 1946
 Rauschivingylus Kontrimav'ichus & Delyamure, 1979

References

Nematode families